Nebela is a diverse genus of testate amoebae of cosmopolitan distribution, belonging to the family Hyalospheniidae. They are "prey agglutinated" or "kleptosquamic" organisms, meaning they take the inorganic plates from their prey to construct their test.

Morphology
Members of this genus have a thin, transparent, pseudochitinous, flattened test that can be ovate, pyriform or elongate, with a length of around 180 microns. The surface of the test has numerous oval or circular scales of variable size, or in rare occasions rectangular or rod-like scales. The protoplasm is granular and colorless but can contain food vacuoles that show color. They have a single nucleus and a variable number of pseudopodia that are blunt in shape. The cell body is attached to the test's interior by strands of ectoplasm.

Classification
Nebela originally belonged to the family Nebelidae, but phylogenetic analyses showed that the genus was paraphyletic and the genera Hyalosphenia and Quadrulella, which belong to Hyalospheniidae, branch within Nebela. Accordingly, the family Nebelidae was synonymised with Hyalospheniidae.

There are at least 13 remaining species in the genus:
Nebela 
Nebela acolla 
Nebela aliciae 
Nebela barbata 
Nebela carinatella 
Nebela collaris  (=Difflugia collaris ; =D. cancellata ; =D. reticulata ; =D. carpio ; =D. laxa ; =D. cellulifera ; =N. numata ; =N. bohemica ; =N. sphagnophila ; =N. tincta var. major ; =N. tincta f. stenostoma )
Nebela equicalceus  (=N. hippocrepis)
Nebela flabellulum 
Nebela guttata 
Nebela meisterfeldi 
Nebela pechorensis 
Nebela rotunda 
Nebela tenella 
Nebela tincta  (=Hyalosphenia tincta ; =N. bursella ; =N. parvula ; =N. minor )

Former species
The paraphyly of Nebela is slowly being resolved by transfering species from Nebela to other genera through phylogenetic analyses. The following species were previously considered Nebela but have been moved accordingly:
Alabasta 
Alabasta kivuense  (=Nebela kivuense )
Alabasta longicollis  (=Nebela longicollis )
Alabasta militaris  (=Nebela militaris ; =N. bursella ; =Nebela americana var. bryophila )
Cornutheca 
Cornutheca ansata  (=Nebela ansata )
Cornutheca saccifera  (=Nebela saccifera )
Cornutheca jiuhuensis (=Nebela jiuhuensis )
Gibbocarina 
Gibbocarina galeata  (=Nebela galeata )
Longinebela 
Longinebela golemanskyi  (=Nebela golemanskyi )
Longinebela penardiana  (=Nebela penardiana )
Longinebela speciosa  (=Nebela speciosa )
Longinebela tubulosa  (=Nebela tubulosa )
Netzelia 
Netzelia tuberculata  (=Nebela tuberculata )
Padaungiella 
Padaungiella lageniformis  (=Nebela lageniformis )
Padaungiella wailesi  (=Nebela wailesi )
Padaungiella wetekampi  (=Nebela wetekampi )
Padaungiella tubulata  (=Nebela tubulata )
Padaungiella nebeloides  (=Nebela nebeloides  )
Planocarina 
Planocarina carinata  (=Nebela carinata )
Planocarina marginata  (=Nebela marginata )
Planocarina maxima  (=Nebela maxima )
Planocarina spumosa  (=Nebela spumosa )
Physochila 
Physochila griseola  (=Nebela griseola )

References

External links

Amoebozoa genera
Tubulinea